The Miss Perú 1985 pageant was held on May 11, 1985. That year, 22 candidates were competing for the national crown. The chosen winner represented Peru at the Miss Universe 1985. The rest of the finalists would enter in different pageants.

Placements

.

Special Awards

 Best Regional Costume - Ancash - Verónica Vivanco
 Miss Photogenic - Callao - Ana María Arce
 Miss Elegance - Pasco - Miluska Newmann
 Miss Body - Piura - Bárbara Vásquez
 Best Hair - Distrito Capital – Liliana Tapia
 Miss Congeniality - Ica - Edith Schever
 Miss Popularity - Callao - Ana María Arce (by votes of readers of CARETAS Magazine)

.

Delegates

Amazonas - Maruxia Garfias
Áncash - Verónica Vivanco
Arequipa - Maritza Pretto
Cajamarca - Elsa Cáceres
Callao - Ana María Arce
Cuzco - Lucy Morales
Distrito Capital - Liliana Tapia Castillo
Huancavelica - Gretel Cornejo
Huánuco - Elsa Ribera Sara
Ica - Edith Schever
Junín - Brigitte Vogier

La Libertad - Ma. Luisa Benavides
Lambayeque - Mónica Campos
Loreto - Gladys Cárdenas
Madre de Dios - Luisa Marina Burgos
Pasco - Miluska Newmann
Piura - Bárbara Vásquez
Puno - Jaqueline Pinto 
San Martín - Lorena Luque
Tacna - María Lucila Escandon
Tumbes - Patricia Olavarría
Ucayali - María Gracia Galleno

.

Judges

 Jaime Andrade - Manager of Toyota
 Noemi Ivcher - Peruvian Designer
 Jorge Galarcep - Regional Manager of Discos Hispanos
 Emily Kreimer - Peruvian Actress
 Germán Kraus - Soap Opera Actor
 Susana Vieira - Brazilian Actress
 Benjamín Chávez Valderrama - Peruvian Bodybuilder & Owner of BENZ Gym
 Gloria Pires - Brazilian Actress
 Monica Brenner - Manager of Discos "El Virrey"
 Magnolia Martínez - Miss Peru 1971 (Miss Congeniality Universe)
 Dr. César Morillas - Plastic Surgeon
 Mario Cavagnaro - Creative Director of Panamericana Televisión

.

Background Music

Opening Show – Los Violines de Lima - "Campesina" (Composed by Pedro Espinel)
Swimsuit Competition – "Sitting Pretty" (Instrumental) (Composed by John Kander & Fred Ebb)
Evening Gown Competition – Herb Alpert & The Tijuana Brass - "Passion Play"
Special Guest Singer - Fausto - "Susana"

.

References 

Miss Peru
1985 in Peru
1985 beauty pageants